James Bannon (May 28, 1852 – March 6, 1938) was an American farmer and politician.

Born in the Town of Auburn, in Fond du Lac County, Wisconsin, Bannon graduated from the Fond du Lac High School and from Worthington Business School in Evanston, Illinois. He also went to Northwestern University. Bannon was a farmer. He served on the Auburn Town Board and was chairman. In 1891, Bannon served in the Wisconsin State Assembly, from New Cassel, Wisconsin, as a Democrat. In 1905, Bannon moved to a farm in Mott, Hettinger County, North Dakota. He served as a probate judge for Hettinger County and was involved with the Nonpartisan League. He lived in Bismarck, North Dakota and died there on March 6, 1938.

Notes

1852 births
1938 deaths
People from Fond du Lac County, Wisconsin
People from Hettinger County, North Dakota
Northwestern University alumni
Farmers from North Dakota
Farmers from Wisconsin
North Dakota Democrats
Wisconsin city council members
Mayors of places in Wisconsin
North Dakota state court judges
Democratic Party members of the Wisconsin State Assembly